Under-occupied developments in China are mostly unoccupied property developments in China, and mostly referred to as "ghost cities" or "ghost towns". The phenomenon was observed and recorded as early as 2006 by writer Wade Shepard, and subsequently reported by news media over the decades.

Terminology 
Media outlets often label under-occupied development areas in China as ghost cities or ghost towns. However, the two terms are technically misnomers since the term "ghost town" describes places that previously had economic activity but have since become defunct and abandoned, while many under-occupied developments in China are new installations that have yet to receive residential occupation.

Additionally, some reported cases of ghost cities are not in and of themselves administrative entities but instead districts built in the suburban region of functioning cities to provide accommodation for a growing urban population.

Background 

The way in which property values are structured in China plays a role in the creation of "ghost cities", according to author Wade Shepard, who has traveled widely to research the phenomenon of China's underoccupied cities. "Economically affordable housing" must be lived in by the owner, and can not be bought and sold as an investment. The developer is only permitted to sell "economically affordable housing" at 5% over the cost of construction. By contrast, "commodity housing" can be bought and sold as an investment. Because housing is a physical object, and China's large population guarantees an ongoing demand for housing, commodity housing is considered a more secure way to store money. Except in some Tier 3 and Tier 4 cities, which have different government regulations, "commodity housing" generally sells as an investment. In addition, these homes typically serve as future homes for the buyer's offspring to live in when they get married.

Construction of "commodity housing" is driven by the disparity between urban and rural land prices. Rural land, which must be collectively owned, is redesignated by a municipality as urban-construction land, which can then be resold by the municipality at as much as forty times the price. Shepard explains that municipalities must pass on about 40% of their tax revenues to Beijing and are responsible for about 80% of their expenses. Hence, there is an incentive to seek non-tax-income streams. According to Shepard, as of 2015, "40% of the revenue that local governments in China make is from land sales." In 2012, this type of development created $438 billion (394 billion euros) for China's local governments.

In 2015, Wade Shepard reported that developers acquire new plots of land from local governments and are mandated to construct something more or less immediately. Developers can't sit idly on vacant land and wait for the surrounding area to develop until it's economically viable. This creates the quick-buck mentality in developers to rapidly build in the new area without the necessary demand for housing.

In 2021, Business Insider, reported that in 2020 China had about 65 million empty homes. In the article, academic Xin Sun said in China there is a strong popular belief that real estate is the best way for preserving and generating wealth, leading to great demand for buying property; something the government encourages. The Economist reported that in some areas demand for property greatly outstripped supply, typically in cites. However, at the same time in poorer rural areas few people were buying properties, and in those areas there was a glut of empty houses.

Criticism

In 2015, Wade Shepard, author of Ghost Cities of China, criticized the "ghost city" term for focusing too much on the short term results, or "calling the game at halftime". A common assumption by foreign media is that local officials are strictly incentivized to start construction on this newly created urban land to boost GDP growth and look good within the Party. However, Shepard points out many places which started becoming ghost cities were under the jurisdiction of an area with already strong GDP growth. He argues that these developments are seen as an investment for the future and promote development with timescales of over 20 years.

Ordos Kangbashi is often seen as one of the first and most prominent examples of the international Chinese ghost city phenomenon and fascination. Some journalists have pointed to the Ordos Kangbashi ghost city stories as an example of media hastily and often misinformed reporting of developments in China. Such reporting may not convey the perspectives of local officials and experts, and may seek to attract readers unfamiliar with China’s development model and bemused at China's perceived backwardness. As of 2015, it was reported that Ordos Kangbashi has a population of 100,000 people, 80 percent of which are full time residents, with the remainder commuting daily from nearby Dongsheng for work.

Circa 2016, Chicago-based photographer Kai Caemmerer investigated and noted the discrepancy between the news reports and actual situation. He noted, "Many of these new cities are not expected to be complete or vibrant until 15-20 years after they begin construction."

2018 onwards 
Many developments initially criticized as ghost cities did materialize into economically vibrant areas when given enough time to develop, such as Pudong, Zhujiang New Town, Zhengdong New Area, Tianducheng and malls such as the Golden Resources Mall and South China Mall. While many developments failed to live up to initial lofty promises, most of them eventually became occupied when given enough time.

Reporting in 2018,  Shepard noted that "Today, China’s so-called ghost cities that were so prevalently showcased in 2013 and 2014 are no longer global intrigues. They have filled up to the point of being functioning, normal cities".

List of cities 
Pudong - one of the first ghost cities, now a prominent global financial district of Shanghai.
Chenggong District - the chief zone for the expansion of the city of Kunming. , much of the newly constructed housing in Chenggong was still unoccupied, and it is reportedly one of the largest ghost cities in Asia. However, some commentators expect it to become occupied over the next few years, as central Kunming is overcrowded. Some Government departments are to move to Chenggong in 2012, and a subway line to the city center opened in 2013.
Ordos City, Kangbashi New Area - described in 2009 by news media as a 'ghost city'. By 2016, 100,000 people lived there.
Nanhui New City
Yujiapu Financial District
Yingkou - a prefecture level city in Liaoning province. The prefecture level city has five years of unsold apartments with a number of abandoned projects.
 Lanzhou New Area

See also
Chinese property bubble (2005–2011)
Housing in China
Real estate in China
Spatial mismatch
Caojiawan station

References

Further reading 

 Under-occupied
China